Yakob Mar Irenios is Metropolitan of Kochi Diocese of Malankara Orthodox Syrian Church.

References

1949 births
Living people
Malankara Orthodox Syrian Church bishops